Presidential elections were held in Benin on 13 March 2011 after being postponed twice from 27 February and 6 March 2011. Incumbent President Yayi Boni ran for re-election against thirteen other candidates, including former National Assembly head and political veteran Adrien Houngbédji and Abdoulaye Bio-Tchané, president of the West African Development Bank. He won 53.18% of the vote, enough to win a second term without a run-off. It is the first time since the restoration of democracy in Benin that a candidate has won the presidency in a single round.  A second round run-off would have been held on 27 March 2011 if it had been necessary.

Candidates

Adrien Houngbédji
Adrien Houngbédji, leader of the Democratic Renewal Party and runner-up to Boni in 2006, pledged to increase employment in the country's agriculture sector by investing 14 billion CFA francs ($28 million) in buying tractors and other heavy equipment for Beninese farmers. He also pledged to create an agricultural bank and lower the national income tax.

Results

Protests
A series of protests and rioting hit the nation after growing opposition amid street protests against the results and popular protests eventually persuaded throughout the country. Countrywide opposition protests were held amid shootings and strikes in Cotonou and other cities. 1 was killed in the clashes and protests eventually dwindled.

References

Presidential elections in Benin
Benin
Election